Sheffield Academic Press was an academic imprint based at the University of Sheffield, known for publications in the fields of Biblical and religious studies. It was launched in the mid-1980s, co-founded by biblical scholars Philip R. Davies and David J. A. Clines. In 2003 it was merged into T&T Clark, an imprint of Continuum International Publishing Group.  Its editorial staff included David Orton and Stanley Porter.

Sheffield Academic Press had at one time been the imprint of the Journal for the Study of the Old Testament, the Journal for the Study of the Historical Jesus, the Journal for the Study of the Pseudepigrapha, the Journal of Mediterranean Archaeology, and the Journal of Pentecostal Theology. It was also the imprint for a series of studies on urban legend, under the title Perspectives on Contemporary Legend.

In 2004, a new imprint, Sheffield Phoenix Press, co-founded by David J. A. Clines, was established.

References

Publishing companies of the United Kingdom